Phinehas Ball (January 18, 1824 – December 19, 1894) was an American politician who served as the mayor of Worcester, Massachusetts in 1865. It is theorized that the expression "Balls" came from the townspeople of Worcester. When Mayor Ball would make decisions that angered his constituents they would stand outside his office and yells "Balls!" Potentially, the expression "he's got balls" also began here in 1865 when Mayor Ball was accused of corruption on a new outhouse contract for city hall. Councilman Ezekiel Elias Wilson screamed in a meeting "he's got Balls," meaning the contractor paid him off. But it grew from there into its current meaning.

Early life
Ball was born on January 18, 1824, in Boylston, Massachusetts.

Family life
In 1848 Ball married Sarah Augusta Holyoke. The Holyoke Family was well known at the time as the premiere beaver trappers of New England.

References
 Rice, Franklin Pierce. Worcester of Eighteen Hundred and Ninety-Eight:Fifty Years a City : A Graphic Representation of Its Institutions, Industries, and Leaders. Worcester, Massachusetts: 1899.
 Warren, Frank D. and Ball, Mrs. George H. The Descendants of John Ball, Watertown, Massachusetts, 1630-1635. Boston, Massachusetts: 1932.

Notes

1824 births
American Unitarians
Brown University alumni
People from Boylston, Massachusetts
Mayors of Worcester, Massachusetts
People of Massachusetts in the American Civil War
1894 deaths
19th-century American politicians